The Benveniste affair was a major international controversy in 1988, when Jacques Benveniste published a paper in the prestigious scientific journal Nature describing the action of very high dilutions of anti-IgE antibody on the degranulation of human basophils, findings what seemed to support the concept of homeopathy. As a condition for publication, Nature asked for the results to be replicated by independent laboratories. The controversial paper published in Nature was eventually co-authored by four laboratories worldwide, in Canada, Italy, Israel, and France.

After the article was published, a follow-up investigation was set up by a team including physicist and Nature editor John Maddox, illusionist and well-known skeptic James Randi, as well as fraud expert Walter W. Stewart, who had recently raised suspicion of the work of Nobel laureate David Baltimore. With the cooperation of Benveniste's own team, the group failed to replicate the original results, and subsequent investigations did not support Benveniste's findings. Benveniste refused to retract his controversial article, and he explained (notably in letters to Nature) that the protocol used in these investigations was not identical to his own. However, his reputation was damaged, so he began to fund his research himself, as his external sources of funding were withdrawn. In 1997, he founded the company DigiBio to "develop and commercialise applications of Digital Biology".

Nature publication and investigation 
Jacques Benveniste, a French immunologist, published a paper in the prestigious scientific journal Nature describing the action of very high dilutions of anti-IgE antibody on the degranulation of human basophils. Biologists were puzzled by Benveniste's results, as only molecules of water, and no molecules of the original antibody remained in these high dilutions. Benveniste concluded that the configuration of molecules in water was biologically active; a journalist coined the term water memory for this hypothesis. Much later, in the 1990s, Benveniste also asserted that this "memory" could be digitized, transmitted, and reinserted into another sample of water, which would then contain the same active qualities as the first sample.

Unusual disclaimer 
Following replication, the article was then published in Nature, which printed an editorial titled "When to believe the unbelievable" in the same issue of the journal and attached the following disclaimer to the article: "Editorial reservation: Readers of this article may share the incredulity of the many referees. ... There is no physical basis for such an activity. ... Nature has therefore arranged for independent investigators to observe repetitions of the experiments." The last time such a disclaimer had been added was in 1974 to an article on Uri Geller.

Critical investigation 
A week after publication of the article, Nature sent a team of three investigators to Benveniste's lab to attempt to replicate his results under controlled conditions. The team consisted of Nature editor and physicist Sir John Maddox, American scientific fraud investigator and chemist Walter W. Stewart, and skeptic and former magician James Randi.

The team pored over the laboratory's records and oversaw seven attempts to replicate Benveniste's study. Three of the first four attempts turned out somewhat favorable to Benveniste; however, the Nature team was not satisfied with the rigor of the methodology. Benveniste invited them to design a double blind procedure, which they did, and conducted three more attempts. The samples were randomized, and Randi wrapped the codes which identified the samples in tinfoil before fixing it on to the ceiling with adhesive tape.  Before fully revealing the results, the team asked if there were any complaints about the procedure, but none were brought up. These stricter attempts turned out negative for Benveniste.  In response to Benveniste's refusal to withdraw his claims, the team published in the July 1988 edition of Nature. Since multiple readings of the samples were closer than statistically expected for the non-double blind tests, the team argued that unintentional bias was the culprit.

In the same issue of the journal Nature, and in subsequent commentary, Benveniste denied all the claims  and stated that such "Salem witchhunts or McCarthy-like prosecutions will kill science."

After Dark 

On 3 September 1988 Channel 4 broadcast an After Dark television discussion featuring Benveniste, James Randi and Walter W. Stewart among others (including Jonathan Miller), reviewed the following week by Sean French in the New Statesman.

Attempts to replicate Benveniste's results

Academy of Sciences 
In 1991, Benveniste found the French Academy of Sciences willing to publish his latest results, obtained under the supervision of Alfred Spira, a statistician, in its weekly Proceedings. Eric Fottorino writing in Le Monde relates how the remorseful Academy of Science noticed that an earlier edition contained a study critical of the memory of water. Seizing on this opportunity, the Academy ordered the printing to stop and the already printed copies destroyed, so that it could print a revised edition, in which Benveniste's article was labeled a mere "right of reply"—downgraded from the status of an article. The study is a replication of early high dilution experiments, in collaboration with Inserm U292.

Although the new findings fell substantially short of confirming the patterns previously claimed by Benveniste, writer Yves Lignon quotes study co-author and statistician Alfred Spira, who said that "the transmission of information persisted at high dilution", and acknowledged that a "weakness in the experimental procedure was possible".

Ovelgonne et al. 

A group of Dutch researchers reported their failure to duplicate the results in Experientia in 1992:

Hirst et al. 

A group of English researchers reported another failure to duplicate the results in Nature in 1993:

However, Benveniste in a 1994 letter to Nature argued that the study neglected to faithfully follow his methods. The study has also been criticized on the grounds that its results were more favourable to Benveniste's claims than the study authors acknowledged in their conclusion.

Josephson and the APS 

After the Nature controversy, Benveniste gained the public support of Brian Josephson, a Nobel laureate physicist with a reputation for openness to paranormal claims. Experiments continued along the same basic lines, culminating with a 1997 paper claiming the effect could be transmitted over phone lines. This was followed by two additional papers in 1999 and another, in the controversial non-peer reviewed Medical Hypotheses, on remote-transmission in 2000 by which time it was claimed that it could also be sent over the Internet.

Time magazine reported in 1999 that, in response to skepticism from physicist Robert Park, Josephson had challenged the American Physical Society (APS) to oversee a replication by Benveniste. This challenge was to be "a randomized double-blind test", of his claimed ability to transfer the characteristics of homeopathically altered solutions over the Internet:

The APS accepted the challenge and offered to cover the costs of the test. When he heard of this, Randi offered to throw in the long-standing $1 million prize for any positive demonstration of the paranormal, to which Benveniste replied: "Fine to us" in his DigiBio NewsLetter. Randi later noted that Benveniste and Josephson did not follow up on their challenge, mocking their silence on the topic as if they were missing persons.

Ennis et al. 

An article published in Inflammation Research in 2004 brought new media attention to the issue with this claim:

Following up on a study they had published in 1999 in the same journal, the researchers concluded that an effect did exist. Some of the researchers had not been involved in homeopathic research before, while others had, such as former Benveniste collaborator Philippe Belon, research director at the homeopathic company Boiron. It was Madeleine Ennis who received the most attention in the media. Ennis led the activities at the British lab, with other labs in Europe, running a variation of Benveniste's water memory experiments. Ennis states that she began the research as a skeptic, but concluded that the "results compel me to suspend my disbelief and start searching for rational explanations for our findings."

BBC Horizon 

In 2002 BBC Horizon broadcast its failed attempt to win James Randi's $1 million prize to prove that a highly diluted substance could still have an effect. Prominent spokespersons on both sides of the debate were interviewed, including Benveniste.

A report was published in 2005 on the prestigious journal of statistics Significance by the statistician Martin Bland, professor at the University of York.

Further study 

With the support of Brian Josephson, the experiments continued, culminating in a 1997 paper claiming a water memory effect could be transmitted over phone lines. This culminated in two additional papers in 1999 and another on remote-transmission in 2000.

Intrigued by Benveniste's claims that biological interactions could be digitized, the US Defense Advanced Research Projects Agency (DARPA) asked Wayne Jonas, homeopath and then director of the US National Center for Complementary and Alternative Medicine, to organize an attempt at independently replicating the claimed results. An independent test of the 2000 remote-transmission experiment was carried out in the US by a team funded by the US Department of Defense. Using the same experimental devices and setup as the Benveniste team, they failed to find any effect when running the experiment. Several positive results were noted, but only when a particular one of Benveniste's researchers was running the equipment. Benveniste admitted to having noticed this himself, and offered a variety of reasons to explain what appeared to be another example of experimenter effect. The experiment is also notable for the way it attempted to avoid the confrontational nature of the earlier Maddox test.
The study implemented "A social and communication management process that was capable of dealing with conflicting interpersonal dynamics among vested parties in the research effort." One of Benveniste's machines was used, and, in the design and pilot project phase in 2001, Benveniste and other members of his DigiBio lab participated as consultants. Interviews at the time indicated study participants were satisfied with the way the study was being conducted. In the end, the authors reported in The FASEB Journal in 2006 that "Our team found no replicable effects from digital signals".

INSERM 

The July 1989 edition of Nature reported that INSERM placed Benveniste on probation following a routine evaluation of his lab. Although INSERM found that his laboratory activities overall were exemplary, it expressed severe discomfort with his high dilution studies, and criticized him for "an insufficiently critical analysis of the results he reported, the cavalier character of the interpretations he made of them, and the abusive use of his scientific authority vis-à-vis his informing of the public".

See also 
 Experimental errors and frauds in physics
 Junk science
 Pathological science
 Protoscience
 Topics characterized as pseudoscience
 Scientific misconduct

Notes

References
 BBC Horizon (2002) Homeopathy: The Test, first broadcast 26 November 2002. Summary and transcript. Rebroadcast on ABC Catalyst in 2003.Homeopathy Part 1
 
 Burridge, Jim (1992) "A Repeat of the 'Benveniste' Experiment: Statistical Analysis", Research Report 100, Department of Statistical Science, University College London, England. (early version of Hirst et al.)
 Chaplin, Martin (2000–2006) "Water Structure and Behavior London South Bank University
 
 
 Fottorino, Eric (1997) Le Monde,  21, 22 & 23 January 1997.
 
 
 Ives, John (2002) "Evaluating Unusual Claims and Devices Using a Team Approach: A Case Study", Subtle Energies & Energy Medicine, 13(1):39-59, based on Dr. Ives Keynote Address made at the Twelfth Annual ISSSEEM Conference The Co-Creation Process in Energy Medicine: A Synergy of the Sciences and the Healing Arts, 14–19 June 2002. Abstract, Full text
 
 Jonas, W. B. & J. Jacobs (1996) Healing with Homeopathy, Warner.
 Lignon, Yves (1999) "L’Homéopathie et la mémoire de l’eau", Les dossiers scientifiques de l'étrange, Chapter 21, Michel Lafon Publishing. . Full text in French
 
 
 Milgrom, Lionel (1999) "The memory of molecules", The Independent, 19 March. Full text
 
 Park, Bob (1999) "The Challenge: Homeopathy Via the Internet", What's New, 14 May. Full text (source 1)(2)
 Park, Bob (1997) "Alternative Medicine and the Laws of Physics", Skeptical Inquirer, 1 September 1997.
 Randi, James. Commentary. 26 January 2001 "a Nobel Laureate reneges" Commentary, January 26, 2001 - Computer problems, a Nobel Laureate reneges, more magnetic shoes, the metric system, and .... 5 September 2003 "Benveniste and Josephson on Abandoning Science" Commentary, September 5, 2003 — Benveniste and Josephson on Abandoning Science, Denmark Gets Our Reject, Talking Pots Again, APS on Texas, AOL Into Astrology, Official Astrology in Portugal, Galileo on Con-Artists, Curing Spiky Hair, Rationality Discovered in Ontario, How Proles Think, and Roy's Rock in Alabama....
 
 
 Schiff, Michel. The Memory of Water: Homoeopathy and the Battle of Ideas in the New Science (Thorsons, 1995)
 Vithoulkas, George (2003) The controversy with the BBC program Horizon. Full text
 Walker, Martin (1993) "Dr Jacques Benveniste: The Case of the Missing Energy", Chapter in Dirty Medicine, Slingshot Publications, London. Chapter full text (source 1) (2)

Bibliography
 Benveniste, Jacques (2005) Ma vérité sur la 'mémoire de l'eau, Albin Michel. 
 Benveniste, Jacques, and Peter Jurgens. On the Role of Stage Magicians in Biological Research The Anomalist 1998
 Benveniste, Jacques. Electromagnetically Activated Water and the Puzzle of the Biological Signal INSERM Digital Biology Laboratory (10 March 1999)
 Benveniste, Jacques. "Put a match to pyre review". Nature. 396. 10 December 1998.
 Benveniste, Jacques. "Further Biological Effects Induced by Ultra High Dilutions: Inhibition by a Magnetic Field", In P.C. Endler, ed.,Ultra High Dilution: Physiology and Physics. Dordrecht: Kluwe academic, 1994
 Benveniste, Jacques, "Transfer of Biological Activity by Electromagnetic Fields". Frontier Perspectives 3(2) 1993:113-15.
 
 
 
 
 
 Benveniste, J., Davenas, E. & A. Spira (1991) Comptes Rendus de l'Académie des Sciences, January.

External links
 Association Jacques Benveniste pour la Recherche (in French), including an obituary (in English)
 Obituary from the Guardian, 2004
 Obituary, British Medical Journal, 27 November 2004

Homeopathy
Discovery and invention controversies